Durduri District is a district in the northern Sanaag region of Somalia.

References

Durduri: Somalia

Districts of Somalia
Sanaag